Philippe Parès (1 January 1901 – 2 February 1979) was a 20th-century French composer of film scores, d'operettas and light music.

Biography 
The son of Gabriel Parès, music conductor of the Republican Guard, Philippe Parès met Georges Van Parys in the beginning of the 20s. Georges Van Parys, one year younger, commenced from 1925 to compose little pieces (one-act operettas or musical sketches) and songs. In 1927, they collaborated for the first time on La Petite dame du train bleu, which was created in Lyon. The same year, Lulu was presented in Paris, at the Théâtre Daunou. They worked together until 1931. In particular, they wrote the music for the film The Million by René Clair, in collaboration with Armand Bernard.

Philippe Parès then made a career as a producer of records and music publisher (ambience and film music, education, works for children ...). He produced, particularly around 1928-1929, several important scores of the late silent film era: La Femme et le Pantin by Jacques de Baroncelli and The Passion of Joan of Arc by Carl Dreyer (music by Victor Alix and Léo Pouget), among others.

Operettas and musical comedies 
With Georges van Parys :
1927: Lulu, three-act operetta, libretto and lyrics by Serge Veber.
1927: La Petite dame du train bleu ou Quand y en a pour deux, three-act musical comedy, libretto by Georges Lignereux and Léopold Marchès.
1928: L' Eau à la bouche, three-act operetta, libretto by Serge Veber.
1929: Louis XIV, operetta in 3 acts and 5 tableaux, libretto by Serge Veber.
1930: Le Cœur y est, musical comedy in 3 acts and 4 tableaux, libretto by Raoul Praxy, lyrics by Roger Bernstein.
1931: Couss-Couss, extravaganza operetta in 3 acts and 5 tableaux, libretto by Jean Guitton.

Alone:
1947: La bride sur le cou, musical comedy, libretto by André Huguet, Henri Lemarchand and Max Eddy.

Filmography 
1929: Paris-girls by Henry Roussell
1929: The Road Is Fine by Robert Florey
1930: Les Amours de minuit by Augusto Genina, Marc Allégret
1931: Black and White by Robert Florey, Marc Allégret
1931: Le Million by René Clair 
1931: Je serai seule après minuit by Jacques de Baroncelli
1931: Un soir de rafle by Carmine Gallone 
1932: The Marriage of Mademoiselle Beulemans by Jean Choux 
1932: Une petite femme dans le train by Karl Anton 
1934: Toboggan by Henri Decoin 
1938: Un fichu métier by Pierre-Jean Ducis 
1941: Le Club des soupirants by Maurice Gleize 
1947: Une jeune fille savait by Maurice Lehmann
1959: Interpol Against X by Maurice Boutel

External links 
 Phlippe Parès on data.bnf.fr
 
 Georges van Parys et Philippe Parès sur le site de la revue Opérette

Musicians from Paris
1901 births
1979 deaths
French male classical composers
French operetta composers
French film score composers
French male film score composers
20th-century classical composers
20th-century French composers
20th-century French male musicians